Melbourne Central Catholic (MCC) is an American private, Roman Catholic, coed college-preparatory school high school located in Melbourne, in Brevard County, Florida. It was a Blue Ribbon School of Excellence in 1991.

Campus
44 acre campus includes seven classroom buildings, a gymnasium, a multi-purpose room, a technology center, an administrative building, and an athletic complex.

Sports
23 varsity athletic programs.

Notable alumni
Thad Altman, Florida State Senator
Vinny Capra, MLB player for the Tornato Blue Jays 
Kate Chastain, Private Jet & Yachting Chief Steward; Published Author; Below Deck Television Show Personality
RJ Scaringe, Founder and CEO of Rivian
Obi Toppin, NBA player for the New York Knicks.
Melissa Witek, '99, Miss Florida USA 2005 and contestant on NBC's Treasure Hunters

Footnotes

External links
Official School website

High schools in Brevard County, Florida
Buildings and structures in Melbourne, Florida
Roman Catholic Diocese of Orlando
Catholic secondary schools in Florida
Educational institutions established in 1961
1961 establishments in Florida